The High Judicial Council  is the highest judicial authority in Syria.

Current members
 Chairman of the High Judicial Council: President Bashar al-Assad.
 Vice-Chairman of the High Judicial Council: Minister of Justice Ahmad al-Sayyed.
 Deputy to the minister of justice: Mr. Samir Branbo.
 Chairman of the Court of Cassation: Mr. Nael Mahfouz.
 Chairman of the judicial review department: Mr. Tayseer Qalaoud.
 Vice-Chairman of the Court of Cassation: Mr. Issa Zoukani.
 Vice-Chairman of the Court of Cassation: Mr. Anas al-Zain.
 Vice-Chairman of the Court of Cassation: Mr. Mustapha al-Atrash.

Competences
The council is charged with the appointment, transfer and dismissal of judges. It is composed of senior civil judges and chaired by the president. The independence of the judiciary is guaranteed by president in his role as chairman of the High Judicial Council, according to Article 131 of the constitution. Article 133 stipulates that judges be autonomous and subject to no authority other than the law.

References

National councils of the judiciary
Judiciary of Syria